The Gorontalo macaque or Dumoga-bone macaque (Macaca nigrescens) is a species of primate in the family Cercopithecidae. It is endemic to the island of Sulawesi in Indonesia.

References

Gallery

Gorontalo macaque
Primates of Indonesia
Mammals of Sulawesi
Gorontalo macaque
Taxonomy articles created by Polbot
Taxa named by Coenraad Jacob Temminck